In Korean, Chunjiang may refer to:
 Brigadier General. See Brigadier General#Korea
 Korean name for sweet bean sauce